

Highest-grossing animated films of the 1980s
Figures are given in U.S. dollars (USD). Walt Disney Animation Studios is the most represented studio with 5 feature films.

Highest-grossing film by year

See also
List of animated feature films of the 1980s

References

1980s
1980s animated films
Animated
Animated